The 1973 Arkansas Razorbacks football team represented the University of Arkansas in the Southwest Conference (SWC) during the 1973 NCAA Division I football season. In their 16th year under head coach Frank Broyles, the Razorbacks compiled a 5–5–1 record (3–3–1 against SWC opponents), finished in a tie for fourth place in the SWC, and were outscored by their opponents by a combined total of 184 to 124.

Running back Dickey Morton averaged 118 yards per game on the ground, the ninth highest average in the nation.

Schedule

Personnel

Season summary

at USC

Oklahoma State

Iowa State

TCU

Quarterback Mike Kirkland threw for one touchdown and ran for another in Arkansas' 15th straight win over TCU. It was the SWC opener for both teams.

at Baylor

Texas

Tulsa

Texas A&M

at Rice

at SMU

Texas Tech

References

Arkansas
Arkansas Razorbacks football seasons
Arkansas Razorbacks football